Cambundi-Catembo  (pre-1975: Nova Gaia) is a town and municipality, with a population of 46,312 (2014 census), in Malanje Province in Angola. The municipality consists of four communes Cambundi-Catembo (commune), Dumba Cambango, Quitapa and Tala Mungongo.

References

Populated places in Malanje Province
Municipalities of Angola